Khun Parissuddho (alternatively Luang Por Khun, occasionally with honorific titles Luang Por and Phra) or in honorific name "Phra Dhebwiddhayakama" was a Thai Buddhist monk based in Wat Ban Rai. He died on 12 May 2015, age 91.

Early life
He was born on 4 October 1923. His birthname was Khun Chatproklang and he was the son of Bun and Thongkhao Chatproklang. He had two younger sisters. He and his sisters were looked after by his aunt after their parents died during his youth. When he was 6 years old, he started studying Buddhism and Thai language with Ajahn Chueam Widdharo, Ajahn Chai and Ajahn Lee.

Dhamma life
He was ordained in Wat Thanon Hak Yai on 5 May 1934, with dhamma name Parissuddho. He was a student of Luang Por Daeng from Wat Ban Nong Phoe. He was a bhikku who strictly practiced Dhamma, and was respected by many people.

Later, he became a student of Luang Phor Khong Bhuddhasaro. Understanding the Dhamma he then went Dhamma travel in Nakhon Ratchasima province, then further Dhamma travel to Laos and Cambodia. In 1939, he returned to Nakhon Ratchasima Province where with help from the people of Ban Rai village then developed Wat Ban Rai Buddhist Temple. He was residing there until he passed away on 12 May 2015, age 91 years old. His funeral was held on 29 January 2019, in Khon Kaen University.

References

External links
 Website of Wat Ban Rai

1923 births
2015 deaths
Thai Theravada Buddhist monks
People from Nakhon Ratchasima province